Bombus cryptarum is a species of bumblebee. It is native to the northern hemisphere, where it is "one of the most widespread bumblebees in the world." It occurs throughout Europe, Asia, and western North America. It is known commonly as the cryptic bumblebee.

The species' complete distribution is unclear due to taxonomic uncertainties. It is part of a species complex of several bees in the subgenus Bombus sensu stricto, which are very similar and difficult to tell apart.

It has only recently been identified in the British Isles.

The Bombus cryptarum taxa is different from the Bombus magnus which was determined after research found that the Mitochondrial cytochrome oxidase 1 and labial gland secretions distinguished the two taxa apart. The Bombus cryptarum florilegus, an endangered species of Bombus in the region of Japan,  had previously been identified as having a closely relationship with Bombus Lucorum.  In reference back the endangered species, Bombus cryptarum florilegus, these were found to be low in genetic diversity and maintained their own population with immigration from Notsuke Peninsula to the Chishima (Kuril) Islands

In northern areas this bee lives on plains, especially in heather ecosystems. In southern regions it can be found in mountain habitat.

References

Bumblebees
Hymenoptera of Europe
Insects described in 1775
Taxa named by Johan Christian Fabricius